Le Chat Noir (French for "The Black Cat") was a nineteenth-century entertainment establishment, in the bohemian Montmartre district of Paris. It was opened on 18 November 1881 at 84 Boulevard de Rochechouart by the impresario Rodolphe Salis, and closed in 1897 not long after Salis' death.

Le Chat Noir is thought to be the first modern cabaret: a nightclub where the patrons sat at tables and drank alcoholic beverages while being entertained by a variety show on stage. The acts were introduced by a master of ceremonies who interacted with well-known patrons at the tables. Its imitators have included cabarets from St. Petersburg (Stray Dog Café) to Barcelona (Els Quatre Gats) to London's Cave of the Golden Calf.

In its heyday it was a bustling nightclub that was part artist salon, part rowdy music hall. From 1882 to 1895 the cabaret published a weekly magazine with the same name, featuring literary writings, news from the cabaret and Montmartre, poetry, and political satire. It was the subject of an iconic Théophile Steinlen poster in 1896.

Early history
The cabaret began by renting the cheapest accommodations it could find, a small two-room site located at 84 Boulevard Rochechouart, which is now commemorated by a historical plaque. 

Its success was assured with the wholesale arrival of a group of radical young writers and artists called Les Hydropathes ("those who are afraid of water – so they drink only wine"), a club led by the journalist Émile Goudeau. The group claimed to be averse to water, preferring wine and beer. Their name doubled as a nod to the "rabid" zeal with which they advocated their sociopolitical and aesthetic agendas. Goudeau's club met in his house on the Rive Gauche (Left Bank), but had become so popular that it outgrew its meeting place. Salis met Goudeau, whom he convinced to relocate the club meeting place across the river on rue de Laval (now rue Victor-Massé).

Second site 
Le Chat Noir soon outgrew its first site. In June 1885, three and a half years after opening, it moved to larger accommodations at 12 Rue Victor-Massé. The new venue was the sumptuous old private mansion of the Belgian painter Alfred Stevens, who, at Salis' request, transformed it into a "fashionable country inn" with the help of the architect Maurice Isabey.

Soon a growing crowd of poets and singers was gathering at Le Chat Noir, which offered an ideal venue and opportunity to practice their acts before fellow performers, guests and colleagues.

With exaggerated, ironic politeness, Salis most often played the role of conférencier (post-performance lecturer, or master of ceremonies). It was here that the Salon des Arts Incohérents (Salon of Incoherent Arts), shadow plays, and comic monologues got their start.

Famous men and women to patronize Le Chat Noir included Jane Avril, Franc-Nohain, Adolphe Willette, Caran d'Ache, André Gill, Émile Cohl, Paul Bilhaud, Sarah England, Paul Verlaine, Henri Rivière, Claude Debussy, Erik Satie, Charles Cros, Jules Laforgue, Yvette Guilbert, Charles Moréas, Albert Samain, Louis Le Cardonnel, Coquelin Cadet, Emile Goudeau, Alphonse Allais, Maurice Rollinat, Maurice Donnay, Armand Masson, Aristide Bruant, Théodore Botrel, Paul Signac, Porfirio Pires, August Strindberg, George Auriol, Marie Krysinska, and Henri de Toulouse-Lautrec.

The last shadow play by Salis' company was staged in January 1897, after which Salis took the company on tour. Salis was talking of plans to move the cabaret to a location in Paris itself, but he died on 19 March 1897.

The death of Rodophe Salis in 1897 spelled the end of Le Chat Noir. By that time the fascination with Montmartre had already diminished, and Salis had already disposed of many of the club's assets and facilities. Soon after Salis' death, the artists dispersed, and Le Chat Noir slowly disappeared.

Last location 

Ten years later, in 1907, Jehan Chargot opened an eponymous café in an effort to resurrect, modernize, and continue the work of his illustrious predecessor. This new Chat Noir, located at 68, boulevard de Clichy, remained popular into the 1920s.

Today a neon sign which incorporates Steinlen's iconic Chat Noir image is on display at 68, Boulevard de Clichy, now the site of a hotel by the same name.

Other cabarets successfully copied and adapted the model established by Le Chat Noir. In December 1899, Henri Fursy opened his Boîte à Fursy cabaret in the former Chat Noir hotel on rue Victor-Massé. He claimed to have inherited the mantle of Salis, and said his cabaret "has thanks to Fursy become once again the goal of all who 'climb Montmartre' to hear their favorite chansonniers (singers)..."

Shadow play
From its opening, Le Chat Noir was thought of as a meeting point for artists, with an interior design in the style of Louis XIII. In the beginning, poets, musicians, writers, and singers performed on the stage, but they were quickly replaced as the shadow play medium developed at Le Chat Noir and spread from there. The cabaret is still remembered for these.

The shadow play had already been established in France in the 18th century and made popular by Dominique Séraphin, but it had disappeared from the art world during the 19th century. Le Chat Noir was the major cause of the shadow play's renewed popularity in France, as Lotte Reiniger was in Germany by her linking of such shows to the cinema by creating characters from cutout figures and projecting them as shadow puppets.

The birth of the shadow plays in Le Chat Noir took place in a peculiar way. By the end of 1885, the painter Henry Sommer and the illustrator George Auriol built a puppet theater there, intended for adults-only performances. One day Henri Rivière placed a white napkin in front of the opening of the small puppet theater and moved a cardboard puppet behind the white screen with lighting from behind, while Jules Jouy sang, accompanying himself on piano. This was the first shadow play in Le Chat Noir.

In 1887 Rivière replaced the puppet theater with a proper shadow theater, with a screen 44 inches high and 55 inches wide, held by a huge frame. Artists such as cartoonist Adolphe Willette, painter Caran d'Ache, Henri Rivière and George Auriol created the cabaret's shadow plays. They used zinc to create the silhouettes of a few characters (although initially they used cardboard), which they used as puppets, projecting their shadow onto a white screen which was illuminated from behind with electric lights. This was an evolutionary development in the art of shadow plays.

Writers who frequented the club wrote stories for the shadow theater that Rodolphe Salis, the owner of the cabaret, would read out loud after the performance. Thanks to the collaboration of many of the artists of that time, the stories were accompanied by some very complex colour, sound, and movement effects, making them more dynamic and exciting, as well as piano accompaniment.

Over an eleven-year span these plays were presented nightly in the Shadow Theater, totaling more than forty. The Montmartre museum still has a few zinc shapes that had been used in the plays.

The spread of this type of show became successful because of Théophile Steinlen's poster announcing "la tournée du Chat Noir avec Rodolphe Salis", a Shadow Theater tour from Le Chat Noir.

Le Chat Noir made many tours with the Shadow Theater. These started in 1892, basically around France during the summer, although Salis and the company went to Tunis, Algeria, and other French-speaking countries such as Belgium. Some of the artists who played in Salis' performances became so famous that they founded their own cabarets or shows.  Le Chat Noir was supposed to have its last show and tour in January 1897, since Salis died just after that. However, it was his wife who took the charge of the cabaret and organised other tours. During these shows, Dominique Bonnaud replaced Salis and became the storyteller. Although he did it well, the quality of the performances declined. By then, other establishments had become popular by copying Le Chat noir'''s techniques, shows and decor.

Under the management of Rodolphe Salis, Le Chat noir produced 45 théatre d'ombres (shadow play) shows between 1885 and 1896, as the art became more popular in Europe. Behind a screen on the second floor of the establishment, the artist Henri Rivière worked with up to 20 assistants in a large, oxy-hydrogen backlit performance area and used a double optical lantern to project backgrounds. Originally cardboard cutouts were used, but zinc figures took their place after 1887. Various artists took part in the creation, including Steinlen, Adolphe Willette and Albert Robida. Caran d'Ache designed around 50 cutouts for the very popular 1888 show L'Epopée.

 Cultural associations 
French-Colombian street artist Chanoir chose his nickname in reference to the poster.
A poster of Le Chat Noir may be seen prominently in the crime scene photographs from the 2001 death of Kathleen Peterson. 
A poster of Le Chat Noir may also be seen prominently in the movie Breakfast at Tiffany's hanging on the wall over the staircase.  Le Chat Noir is the name of the nightclub where Frank Sinatra and Natalie Wood rekindle their relationship, in the 1958 movie Kings Go Forth. There is also the famous cat painting with blinking eyes on the entrance wall.Le Chat Noir was referenced in Sakura Taisen.
A Le Chat Noir painting is noticeably a background piece in the movie The Secret Life of Pets.
A poster of Le Chat Noir is seen hanging in the bedroom of Claire Carlin, played by Maude Apatow, in the 2020 film The King of Staten Island''.

References

Sources

Further reading

External links
Le Chat Noir 1882-1891 at BnF

1881 establishments in France
Companies disestablished in 1897
Cabarets in Paris
Montmartre